Mystic Marriage of Saint Catherine of Alexandria is an oil on panel painting of the sacra conversazione genre by Andrea del Sarto, executed c. 1512–1513. It was acquired by the imperial gallery in Prague in 1749 and now is in the Gemäldegalerie in Dresden.

The work was produced during an early phase of the artist's work, contemporary with his frescoes in the Chiostrino dei Voti in Santissima Annunziata, Florence, and was a major influence on his principal pupils, especially Rosso Fiorentino and Pontormo.

References

Collections of the Gemäldegalerie Alte Meister
Paintings by Andrea del Sarto
1513 paintings
Andrea del Sarto
Paintings depicting John the Baptist
Paintings of Margaret the Virgin